The Hadera subdistrict is one of Israel's subdistricts in Haifa District. The district is composed of mostly of the Southern half of Mandatory Haifa Subdistrict.

References